Poets of the Fall (POTF) is a Finnish rock band from Helsinki. The group consists of Marko Saaresto (lead vocals), Olli Tukiainen (lead guitar), Markus "Captain" Kaarlonen (keyboards, production), Jani Snellman (bass), Jaska Mäkinen (rhythm guitar), and Jari Salminen (drums, percussion).

History

Early years (2003–2004)
The band was founded on 25 April 2003 by Saaresto and Tukiainen. Tukiainen had written multiple songs for Saaresto's previous band Playground and performed with Finnish jazzband Pohjoinen Syke previously.

In 2003, Saaresto's friend Sami Järvi, a script-writer working at Remedy Entertainment handed Saaresto a poem he had written, asking him to turn it into a song to use in Remedy's video game Max Payne 2: The Fall of Max Payne. The song, entitled "Late Goodbye", was used as the ending-theme of the game as well as a recurring motif, being sung and whistled by multiple characters. It was produced by Markus "Captain" Kaarlonen, who joined the band shortly after due to Saaresto and Tukiainen liking his work.

Kaarlonen being a former employee of benchmark-developer Futuremark, POTF were offered to have their song Lift included in the 2005-literation of Futuremark's benchmarking software 3DMark, which exposed the band to a wider audience than Max Payne 2 had done.

In order to keep complete control and freedom over the band, the members founded their own independent record label, Insomniac, on which they have released all their CDs as of 2014.

On 30 June 2004, the Poets released their debut single Late Goodbye in Finland which was followed by Lift on 9 September 2004. The songs charted No. 14 and No. 8 on the Finnish single charts and reached No. 2 and No. 7 in YleX's 2004-voting for "Best Finnish song". POTF were also voted "Fresh Newcomer of 2004" by YleX. The videos for both songs were directed by Tuomas "Stobe" Harju. POTF performed at Popkomm 2005 in Berlin.

On 18 December 2004, the Poets released a free download single on their website Maybe Tomorrow is a Better Day to market the release of their debut album Signs of Life. After having been taken offline, it was remastered and reissued on the band's second album Carnival of Rust.

Signs of Life (2005–2006)
The band's debut album Signs of Life was released in Finland on 19 January 2005, followed by iTunes on 25 May 2005. It entered the Finnish Top 40 album chart at number one and has been certified platinum by the Finnish IFPI. The album was awarded the Emma Award for the "Best Debut Album of the Year 2005" and the band received the "Best Newcomer of the Year"-Award.

Accompanying the album, the band released a video for the song Lift, directed by Tuomas "Stobe" Harju, and used the songs Stay and Illusion and Dream as promotional radio singles.  The album contains a password granting access to a secret page on poetsofthefall.com that hosts a remix of the song "Lift", entitled "Dramadance Remix" as well as wallpapers made from the "Lift" video and the album artwork.

The title Signs of Life is a reference to the Pink Floyd-instrumental of the same name released in 1987.

Carnival of Rust (2006–2007)
Having won the "Best Finnish Breakthrough"-Award at the NRJ Radio Awards,  POTF released their third single, entitled "Carnival of Rust" in Finland on 22 March 2006 with a release in Germany following on 1 December 2006. The single, which entered the Finnish charts at No. 2, features a radio- and an album-edit as well as a live-recording of Don't Mess With Me, the fourth track on Signs of Life, from the band's performance at Rockperry Festival, Vaasa, Finland on 15 July 2005.

On 30 March 2006, the band released the video to Carnival of Rust which shows a gas-masked woman visiting an old carnival, and also references every song from the band's second album of the same name. The video became hugely popular in Finland, winning two Muuvi Awards as well as the YLE Audience Choice Award as "Best Finnish Music Video of All Time". It was also voted "Best Music Video 2006" by The Voice. In 2009, the video was remastered by Elmeri Raitanen as his bachelor-thesis in visual and media arts at Lahti Institute of Design and reissued in high definition.

The Poets' second album Carnival of Rust was released in Finland on 12 April 2006 and has since been released in Sweden, Australia, Ukraine, Russia, Germany and on iTunes. It includes 11 new songs, a remastered version of Maybe Tomorrow is a Better Day, as well as the music video to the title track. The cover, which sees the return of the lollipop from the first album, was designed by Tuomas Harju.

Carnival of Rust also went straight to No. 1 on the Finnish charts. It has been certified platinum.  It was selected as one of the best albums 2006 by Finland's largest newspaper, Helsingin Sanomat, and was nominated for "Best Finnish Album" at the NRJ Radio Awards as well as "Best Rock Album" at the Emma Awards in 2007.

Revolution Roulette (2008–2009)

In 2008, POTF redesigned their moth-logo and also changed the font used to display their band name. They also participated in the Voice's CD compilation Livenä Vieraissa, with a cover version of Chris Cornell's song "You Know My Name", and their own song "Diamonds for Tears".
In the same year, POTF signed Phoenix Effect, the band of former Sunrise Avenue-guitarist Janne Kärkkäinen to their Insomniac-label and produced their debut album Cyanide Skies with Saaresto / Tukiainen performing additional vocals / guitar work. The album was released on 18 February 2009 in Finland and entered the Finnish album charts at No. 22. POTF also make a cameo-appearance in the video to Phoenix Effect's song "King See No Evil".

Poets of the Fall released their next single called The Ultimate Fling in Finland on 6 February 2008.  The single features three variations of the title track (a radio-edit, an album-edit and an impromptu-version) as well as a live recording of Fire, the opening track of the band's second album Carnival of Rust which was recorded during the Poets' performance at Ankkarock Festival 2007 on 5 August. The single charted at No. 2 in the Finnish singles charts. Months after the release of the single, the band published the accompanying video which consists of fan-recorded footage of the band performing at various gigs.

The third POTF-album, entitled Revolution Roulette, was released in Finland and on iTunes on 26 March 2008. Its cover was designed by Tuomas Harju and features a giant padlock with a built-in roulette, abandoning the lollipop used on the previous album-covers. The record marks the first POTF-album not produced in Markus Kaarlonen's living-room, but the band's own professional studio. It went straight to the top of the Finnish charts and was certified gold two weeks after being released. The band also released the title track of the album as a promotional radio-single. Revolution Roulette is currently the only POTF album that has not been released physically outside Finland. While on tour with the album, the band played their first gig in the United States at Musexpo 2008 in Los Angeles on 29 April 2008.

On 18 September 2009, the band released a "Best of"-compilation in India.

Twilight Theater (2010)
In mid-2009, after finishing the Revolution Roulette-tour, the band announced they would be heading into the studio to record their fourth album, the genre of which they described as "cinematic rock". On 9 December 2009, the band announced that a song entitled "War" from their fourth studio album would be featured in Alan Wake, a psychological thriller video game developed by Remedy Entertainment. Along with "War", Alan Wake also features two new songs, "Children of the Elder God" and "The Poet and The Muse", which were written specifically for the game, and are performed by Poets of the Fall as the in-game band Old Gods of Asgard. In June, the band released a video for "War" (despite it being only a promotional single on radio) which reenacts scenes from the game in live-action. It features Finnish actor Ilkka Villi as the game's protagonist of the same name (Villi also served as the model used for the creation of the Alan Wake character) and the band, except Saaresto. The band portrays in the video some of Alan Wake'''s in-game antagonists, lumberjacks possessed by an evil force named "the Dark Presence". The antagonists are collectively called "the Taken".

On 18 January, the band announced that their fourth album entitled Twilight Theater would be released on 17 March in Finland and that the first single from the album would be Dreaming Wide Awake which debuted on Radio NRJ Suomi on 21 January and was released on 3 February as a limited-edition single. It reached No. 18 on the Finnish single-charts.Twilight Theater was released in Finland and on iTunes on 17 March, followed by Germany, Austria and Switzerland on 29 October. It went straight to the top of the Finnish album charts and was certified gold a week after release.

 Alchemy Vol.1 (2011) 
The band released a double-vinyl edition of their debut album Signs of Life on 19 January 2011, exactly six years after its original release. A CD&DVD-compilation entitled Alchemy Vol.1 was released on 16 March 2011. It contains the band's whole videography as well as the favourite songs of the band-members and also features two new songs, "No End, No Beginning" and "Can You Hear Me". The latter was released digitally on 2 February 2011 and is featured in the remake of Remedy Entertainment's video game Death Rally. The video to the song was directed by Mikko Harma and premiered on The Voice on 18 March 2011.

 Temple of Thought (2012–2013) 
A fifth studio album, Temple of Thought, was released on 21 March 2012 to conform to the release-cycle of two years set by the previous albums. Its name and album cover were revealed on the band's official Facebook page on 25 January 2012. Temple of Thought debuted at #3 on the Finnish charts.

The first single of the new album, Cradled in Love, was released for Finnish radio airplay on 24 January 2012. On 26 January it was released for digital download on the band's official digistore. The band released the music video for the song "Cradled in Love" on 3 March 2012. "The Happy Song", an original song written for Alan Wake's American Nightmare, also appeared on the album. A 45-second snippet of the German radio edit of "Kamikaze Love" was uploaded by Remote Music, an independent German record label, on 24 February 2012. The single was released in Germany on 13 April 2012. A special edition of album was released in Germany and internationally (digital-only) on 20 July 2012. It includes three bonus titles.
The Temple of Thought Tour included locations in Finland, Russia, Germany, Romania and India.

In March 2013, the band announced that they would film their show in Moscow on 23 March, during their 10th Anniversary Tour. They launched a campaign collaborating with PledgeMusic. In April they produced a track called Yö ("night") for the Finnish singer-songwriter Ima. On 13 September 2013 the band released their first live performance DVD titled Live in Moscow.

 Jealous Gods (2013–2015) 
On 8 July 2014 the band announced that their sixth studio album Jealous Gods would be released on 19 September on iTunes and Spotify, along with other digital music retailers, streaming services and selected record stores. The album's first single, Daze, was released on 22 August on their official website along with its music video. Additionally, prior to the album's release, and as a countdown to the new single and video, each Friday, starting from 11 July with Signs of Life, the band released each of their albums on Spotify in chronological order. In October 2014, the band began the Jealous Gods Tour in Finland and Germany.

 Clearview (2016) 
On 11 June 2015, the band announced that they had begun working on their seventh studio album. In January 2016, they announced they would be working with Kent producer Stefan Boman on the album. On 26 May 2016, the band announced that their seventh album would be titled Clearview, to be released on 30 September 2016 and is to be followed by an extensive world tour. On 4 August 2016, the album's first single, "Drama for Life", was released. Clearview was released on 30 September 2016, co-inciding with the start of the Clearview tour in Helsinki.

 Ultraviolet (2018) 

On 11 March 2018, the band announced that their eighth album will be released in October 2018. On 5 October 2018, Poets released their eighth album Ultraviolet, which once again hit the #1 position on the Finnish album chart. Two singles, False Kings and Dancing on Broken Glass, were released prior to the album. Currently the band is recording material for various new projects, as well as playing around the world with the Ultraviolet Tour. In 2019, a single from the album, My Dark Disquiet, was featured in the video game Control.

 Ghostlight (2022) 
On 13 March 2022 Poets of the Fall announced their album Ghostlight, released in April 2022, as a completion to the band's third trilogy, consisting of Clearview, Ultraviolet and Ghostlight. According to the band, Ghostlight'' embodies the idea of metamorphosis, winning over hardship, of acceptance and becoming whole. The first single released was "Requiem for My Harlequin".

Members
 Marko Saaresto – vocals
 Olli Tukiainen – lead guitar
 Markus "Captain" Kaarlonen – keyboards, production
 Jani Snellman – bass
 Jaska Mäkinen – rhythm guitar
 Jari Salminen – drums, percussion

Discography

Studio albums

DVDs

Singles

"*" = refers only to the song, not b-sides etc. featured on the single

B-sides

Compilation albums

Cover songs

Writing credits

Videography

Tours

Awards

In other media

References

External links

Official website
Official YouTube channel

Finnish alternative rock groups
Finnish hard rock musical groups
Finnish musical groups
Finnish rock musicians
Musical groups established in 2003
Finnish musical trios
MTV Europe Music Award winners